The Lee Valley Athletics Centre is  located at the Lee Valley Leisure Complex formerly known as Picketts Lock in Edmonton, London Borough of Enfield. The centre is owned and managed by the Lee Valley Regional Park Authority (LVRPA)

The centre is the largest indoor and outdoor athletics facility serving London and South East England. Housing the only indoor 200 metre six lane track in the South of England, it also comprises a 130-metre sprint straight, permanent seating for 500 spectators both inside and out, full jumps and throws capacity, and cutting-edge sports science and physiotherapy suites. The site is open to the general public as well as elite athletes. On 11 September 2014, the centre hosted the Invictus Games.

Public transport
Rail
 Ponders End railway station
Bus
 London bus W8,  Metroline

References

External links
 Lee Valley Athletics Centre

Sports venues in London
Athletics in London
Lee Valley Park
Edmonton, London